Foolish Age is a Tanzanian drama film released in 2013. It was produced by Elizabeth Michael. The film explores adverse and destructive influences faced by teenagers.

Synopsis
The film tells the story of Loveness (Elizabeth Michael) a young girl who has been raised by her rich father after the death of her mother years ago who died from HIV/AIDS. Loveness and her father are also living with HIV/AIDS. Loveness is studying abroad but she later forces her father to let her study in her home country, Tanzania. She finds a new school and makes new friends, but her best friend (Diana Kimaro) is not a good girl. They engage themselves in love affairs at a young age with different men. They stop attending school in favor of club life and changing men. Loveness leaves her father's well-appointed house without saying goodbye to her father and goes to live a ghetto life. Her father searches everywhere for her but cannot find her and gives up. Loveness continues with that kind of life but later faces life struggles, sexual abuse, and issues with her friends.

Cast 
 Elizabeth Michael
 Diana Kimaro
 Hashim Kambi
 Emmylia Joseph
 Ombeni Phiri
 Mandela Nicholaus
 Ramadhani Miraji
 Mohamed Fungafunga (billed on the poster under alias "Jengua")
 Zamaradi Salim
 Soud Ali
 Idrisa Makupa
 Leah Mussa
 Tiko Hassan

Production
The production company was Classic Production, with Chidy Classic directing. It was produced by Elizabeth Michael in her debut as producer.

Release
The movie was launched on August 31, 2013, at Mlimani City Conference Hall in Dar es Salaam, Tanzania, with a performance from Lady Jaydee, Barnaba and Amini. The movie was later released in DVD and online. In 2014, it was screened at Zanzibar International Film Festival.

Reception
The movies received mostly positive reviews and sold many copies in 2013. In 2014 she won Favorite Actress through her performance in the film and also the film was nominated for Favorite Movie at Tanzania People's Choice Awards.

Awards and nominations

References 

Tanzanian drama films